Amnon Salomon (April 3, 1940 – October 23, 2011) was an Israeli film cinematographer. He was a recipient of the Ophir Award for cinematography.

Biography 
Salomon was born in Tel Aviv in 1940 to a Hungarian-Jewish father and a Russian-Jewish mother. He started his career in the Geva Studios as an assistant to photographer to the Israeli cinematographer David Gurfinkel, a position he held for four years, during which he also assisted filming Uri Zohar's 1964 avant-garde-satiric film Hole in the Moon.

During his career, Solomon filmed 65 films, of which the best-known films included Haham Gamliel (1973), Charlie Ve'hetzi (1973), Beyond the Walls (1985), Alex Is Lovesick (1986) and Cup Final (1992).

In 2003 the Israeli Academy of Film and Television awarded him a prize for his professional achievement. In 2010, in honor of his seventieth birthday, a tribute in his honor was held in the Tel Aviv Cinematheque.

In 2010 Salomon filmed his final film, Dover Koshashvili's Infiltration.

Death
Salomon died on October 23, 2011 at the age of 71, following a long battle with cancer. His death was announced by his spouse, Ilan. Salomon was later interred at Kiryat Shaul Cemetery.

Selected filmography
 2010 - Infiltration
 1999 - Tzur Hadassim
 1998 - Zolgot Hadma'ot Me'atzman
 1998 - Pa'amaim Buskila
 1992 - Gmar Gavi'a
 1992 - Me'Ahorei Hasoragim II
 1990 - Neshika Bametzach
 1989 - Abba Ganuv II
 1989 - Ehad Mishelanu
 1988 - Nisuim Fiktiveem
 1987 - Unsettled Land
 1986 - Alex Is Lovesick
 1985 - Me'Ahorei Hasoragim
 1985 - Goodbye, New York
 1985 - Ad Sof Halaylah
 1984 - Roman Za'ir
 1984 - Sapar Nashim
 1983 - Ovdim Al Ha'Olam
 1982 - Adon Leon
 1981 - Shifshuf Naim
 1979 - Ta'ut Bamispar
 1976 - Lupo B'New York
 1976 - Mishpahat Tzan'ani
 1974 - Charlie Ve'hetzi
 1973 - Haham Gamliel

References

External links
 
 Top cinematographer Amnon Salomon, dies at 71 - published in Haaretz on October 24, 2011

1940 births
2011 deaths
Film people from Tel Aviv
Israeli people of Hungarian-Jewish descent
Israeli people of Russian-Jewish descent
Israeli cinematographers
Israeli LGBT artists
Deaths from cancer in Israel
Burials at Kiryat Shaul Cemetery
20th-century Israeli LGBT people
21st-century Israeli LGBT people